Kenefic is a town in Bryan County, Oklahoma, United States. The population was 196 at the 2010 census, a 2 percent increase from the total of 192 recorded in 2000. The town was named for William Kenefick, president of the Missouri, Oklahoma and Gulf Railroad (MO&G), which had constructed a rail line through the region. The town name has been spelled both Kenefic and Kenefick throughout its history.

History 
At the time of its founding Kenefic was located in Blue County, Choctaw Nation.

Geography

The town is served by both State Highway 48 and State Highway 22.  

McGee Creek State Park and McGee Creek Lake are to the northeast; Lake Texoma is to the southwest.

Climate

Demographics

As of the census of 2000, there were 192 people, 69 households, and 48 families residing in the town. There were 77 housing units at an average density of 78.7 per square mile (30.3/km2). The racial makeup of the town was 78.65% White, 18.75% Native American, 1.04% from other races, and 1.56% from two or more races. Hispanic or Latino of any race were 1.04% of the population.

There were 69 households, out of which 36.2% had children under the age of 18 living with them, 56.5% were married couples living together, 11.6% had a female householder with no husband present, and 29.0% were non-families. 23.2% of all households were made up of individuals, and 13.0% had someone living alone who was 65 years of age or older. The average household size was 2.78 and the average family size was 3.35.

In the town, the population was spread out, with 32.8% under the age of 18, 8.3% from 18 to 24, 31.3% from 25 to 44, 17.2% from 45 to 64, and 10.4% who were 65 years of age or older. The median age was 29 years. For every 100 females, there were 106.5 males. For every 100 females age 18 and over, there were 98.5 males.

The median income for a household in the town was $23,036, and the median income for a family was $24,464. Males had a median income of $22,500 versus $19,375 for females. The per capita income for the town was $10,763. About 21.8% of families and 23.9% of the population were below the poverty line, including 33.8% of those under the age of eighteen and 8.0% of those 65 or over.

References

Towns in Bryan County, Oklahoma
Towns in Oklahoma